The 1991 Sovran Bank Classic was a men's tennis tournament played on outdoor hard courts at the William H.G. FitzGerald Tennis Center in Washington, D.C. in the United States that was part of the Championship Series of the 1991 ATP Tour. It was the 23rd edition of the tournament was held from July 15 through July 21, 1991. First-seeded Andre Agassi won his second consecutive singles title at the event.

Finals

Singles

 Andre Agassi defeated  Petr Korda 6–3, 6–4
 It was Agassi's second singles title of the year and the 14th of his career.

Doubles

 Scott Davis /  David Pate defeated  Ken Flach /  Robert Seguso 6–4, 6–2

References

External links
 Official website
 ATP tournament profile

Sovran Bank Classic
Washington Open (tennis)
1991 in sports in Washington, D.C.
1991 in American tennis